Jedediah Louisa Bila (born January 29, 1979) is an American television host and author. She is known for her time as a co-host on the daytime talk show The View from 2016 to 2017 and an anchor on the weekend edition of the morning news and talk program Fox & Friends from  2019 to 2021. She has also written two books. In June 2022 she was named the host of her own Podcast called Jedediah Bila LIVE on Valuetainment.

Life and career

Background
Bila was born and raised in Brooklyn. She is of Italian descent. She is a graduate of Wagner College, and has a Master of Arts degree from Columbia University. In 2005, she began teaching in New York. She taught creative writing, Spanish, and improvisation to middle school, high school, and college students. She has also served as an academic dean at a private school in New York City.

Television career
Bila's transition from education to politics came in 2009, when she reviewed radio host Mark Levin's book Liberty and Tyranny: A Conservative Manifesto on her blog. Levin later read the review on air, prompting television host Sean Hannity to invite her on his Fox News program, Hannity. She joined Fox News as a contributor in 2013. In April 2014, she began appearing as a panelist on the daytime talk show Outnumbered. She also appeared regularly on the talk show The Five.

In August 2016, Bila departed Fox News to join the ABC daytime talk show The View as a permanent co-host during its 20th season. While on the show, she served as the conservative voice to contrast the liberal co-hosts. In 2017, she interviewed television personality Abby Lee Miller for the special Abby Tells All on Lifetime. That same year, Bila departed The View on September 18.

She rejoined Fox News as a contributor in November 2018. In April 2019, she was named a permanent co-host of the morning news and talk program Fox & Friends Weekend. Bila parted ways with Fox News in May 2021.

A year after her departure from Fox, Bila started her own podcast on Valuetainment entitled Jedediah Bila LIVE on June 8, 2022.

Books
Bila published her first book, Outnumbered: Chronicles of a Manhattan Conservative, in 2011. It is an autobiographical recounting of her experiences as a conservative living and teaching in Manhattan during the 2008 United States presidential election. In 2018, her second book, titled #DONOTDISTURB: How I Ghosted My Cell Phone to Take Back My Life, was published by HarperCollins.

Personal life
Bila married Jeremy Scher in February 2018. They have one child together, a son.

Bila describes herself as "having libertarian political leanings".

Awards and nominations

See also
 New Yorkers in journalism

References

External links
 
 

1979 births
Living people
20th-century American women
21st-century American non-fiction writers
21st-century American women writers
American columnists
American women columnists
American libertarians
American writers of Italian descent
American political commentators
American political writers
American social commentators
American television talk show hosts
American women non-fiction writers
Columbia University alumni
Fox News people
New York (state) Independents
Wagner College alumni
Writers from Brooklyn